O. N. Sunde is a Norwegian holding company owned by Olav Nils Sunde and family. Through its subsidiaries the group operates in many industries, including shipping, real estate, sports and clothing retail, automotive, and insulation. Important operating subsidiaries include Color Group, Sunpor Kunststoff, Voice Norge, ONS Shipholding and O.N. Sunde Eiendom. Corporate head offices are located in Oslo.

Among the brands managed by the group is the cruiseferry company Color Line, the retail brands Voice, Match,  Boys of Europe, VIC, Jean Paul and the insulation brand Sunpor.

References

 www.onsunde.no

Holding companies of Norway
Holding companies established in 1988
Norwegian companies established in 1988